Michael C. Gonzales is an American diplomat serving as the United States ambassador to Zambia. He previously served as the deputy assistant secretary of state in the Bureau of African Affairs.

Early life and education 

Gonzales earned a Bachelor of Arts from Occidental College in Los Angeles and a Master of Arts from the American University School of International Service in Washington, D.C.

Career 

Gonzales is a career member of the Senior Foreign Service, class of Minister-Counselor. He has held many positions throughout his career; he was the director of analysis of Africa in the State Department's Bureau of Intelligence and Research. Overseas, he held leadership positions as the deputy chief of mission of the U.S. embassy in Kathmandu, Nepal and of the U.S. embassy in Lilongwe, Malawi; and as the political and economic counselor of the U.S. embassies in Harare, Zimbabwe and Addis Ababa, Ethiopia. In addition, Gonzales served as spokesperson and Information Officer at the U.S Embassy in Addis Ababa; Ethiopia desk officer in the State Department; and deputy public affairs officer of the U.S. embassy in Kampala, Uganda. Since October 1, 2020, he has served as the deputy assistant secretary of state in the Bureau of African Affairs.

United States ambassador to Zambia 

On April 22, 2022, President Joe Biden announced his intent to nominate Gonzales to be the next United States ambassador to Zambia. On April 25, 2022, his nomination was sent to the Senate. Hearings on his nomination were held before the Senate Foreign Relations Committee on May 24, 2022. The nomination was favorably reported to the Senate floor on June 9, 2022. Gonzales was confirmed by the full Senate on August 4, 2022 by voice vote. He was sworn in in August 2022, and presented his credentials to President Hakainde Hichilema on September 16, 2022.

Personal life
Gonzales speaks Spanish and French.

See also
Ambassadors of the United States

References

Living people
Year of birth missing (living people)
Place of birth missing (living people)
Ambassadors of the United States to Zambia
American University School of International Service alumni
Hispanic and Latino American diplomats
Occidental College alumni
United States Assistant Secretaries of State
United States Department of State officials
United States Foreign Service personnel